Tigers Jaw is the second full-length by American emo band Tigers Jaw. It was released on September 10, 2008, as the band's first album to be released through Prison Jazz. It was then released on vinyl in October 2009 through Photobooth, before a reissue through Run for Cover on August 3, 2010. The songs "Heat", "Meals on Wheels" and "The Sun" are all re-recorded songs from the band's debut album Belongs to the Dead, with "Okay Paddy" having its name changed to "Meals on Wheels". It has appeared on a best-of emo album list by Junkee. Similarly, "I Saw Water" appeared on a best-of emo songs list by Vulture.

Track listing 
All songs written by Tigers Jaw.

Personnel 
Adam McIlwee – guitar, vocals
Ben Walsh – guitar, vocals
Brianna Collins – keyboard, vocals
Dennis Mishko – bass
Pat Brier – drums

References

2008 albums
Tigers Jaw albums